The Small Press Expo (SPX) is an American alternative comics convention. A registered 501(c)(3) that was created in 1994, every year since its inception, SPX has put on a festival, known as The Expo, that provides a forum for artists, writers and publishers of comic art in its various forms to present their creations to the public and to expose the public to comic art not normally accessible through normal commercial channels. The annual SPX festival is typically held in the fall in Bethesda, Maryland. SPX is unique amongst the various comic conventions as it does not allow retailers to have a formal presence at the convention. Only creators and publishers are allowed to set up at the festival, although retailers can and do attend the show with the general public through paid admissions.

SPX is the home of the Ignatz Awards, which have been presented there annually since 1997. As one of the few festival awards rewarded in comics, they are voted on by attendees.

SPX is closely associated with the Comic Book Legal Defense Fund (CBLDF). A portion of the profits from the annual SPX festival including raising activities that take place during the convention weekend, go to the CBLDF. Since 1997, SPX has been held in conjunction with the International Comics and Animation Festival (ICAF) many times.

History 
SPX was founded in 1994 by a group of Washington-Baltimore area retailers to promote diversity in the comics marketplace. It also coincided with Dave Sim's "Spirits of Independence" tour. Attendees of the early years often speak of the close-knit community that was attained during the convention, citing offbeat occurrences such as James Kochalka's nude musical performance in 1998 and the annual pig roast/picnic.

Both the Expo and ICAF, scheduled for September 14–16, were cancelled in 2001 due to creators' travel difficulties related to the September 11, 2001 attacks. The so-called SP-Xiles event was held on September 16 in Brooklyn, New York to in some ways replace the canceled Expo; it raised $1925.00 for the American Red Cross and the New York Fire Fighter's 9-11 Relief Fund.

In 2011 SPX began a new charitable initiative, the Graphic Novel Gift Program. Through this initiative, SPX purchases graphics novels on behalf of a local library system, as selected from a list of works from participating publishers. SPX provides participating libraries with a pull list and a budget. The selected books are provided to the library as a gift of the Small Press Expo. Artist Lili Carre created a special book plate that is included with each volume provided through the SPX Graphic Novel Gift Program.

The 2020 edition of the show, scheduled to be held September 12–13, was cancelled due to the COVID-19 pandemic; the Ignatz Awards ceremony was held online. The 2021 edition of the show was also held entirely online.

Event dates and locations

 1994: June 10 — Bethesda Ramada Inn, Bethesda, Maryland
 1995: June 23 — Bethesda, Maryland
 1996: September 20 — Holiday Inn Select, Bethesda, Maryland
 1997: September 19–21 — Quality Hotel, Silver Spring, Maryland
 1998: September 26–27 — Holiday Inn Select, Bethesda, Maryland
 1999: September 17–19 — Holiday Inn Select, Bethesda, Maryland
2000: September 15–17 — Holiday Inn Select, Bethesda, Maryland
 — cancelled because of 9/11 attacks
2002: September 6–8 — Bethesda Holiday Inn, Bethesda, Maryland
2003: September 5–7 — Holiday Inn Select, Bethesda, Maryland
2004: October 1–3 — Holiday Inn Select Bethesda, Bethesda, Maryland
2005: September 23–24 — Holiday Inn Select Bethesda, Bethesda, Maryland
2006: October 13–14 — Bethesda North Marriott Hotel & Conference Center, North Bethesda, Maryland
2007: October 12–13 — Bethesda North Marriott Hotel & Conference Center, North Bethesda, Maryland
2008: October 4–5 — Bethesda North Marriott Hotel & Conference Center, North Bethesda, Maryland
2009: September 26–27 — Bethesda North Marriott Hotel & Conference Center, North Bethesda, Maryland
2010: September 11–12 — Bethesda North Marriott Hotel & Conference Center, North Bethesda, Maryland
2011: September 10–11 — Bethesda North Marriott Hotel & Conference Center, North Bethesda, Maryland
2012: September 15–16 — Bethesda North Marriott Hotel & Conference Center, North Bethesda, Maryland
2013: September 14–15 — Bethesda North Marriott Hotel & Conference Center, North Bethesda, Maryland
2014: September 13–14 — Bethesda North Marriott Hotel & Conference Center, North Bethesda, Maryland
2015: September 19–20 — Bethesda North Marriott Hotel & Conference Center, North Bethesda, Maryland
2016: September 17–18 — Bethesda North Marriott Hotel & Conference Center, North Bethesda, Maryland
 2017: September 16–17 — Bethesda North Marriott Hotel & Conference Center, North Bethesda, Maryland
 2018: September 15–16 — Bethesda North Marriott Hotel & Conference Center, North Bethesda, Maryland
 2019: September 14–15 — Bethesda North Marriott Hotel & Conference Center, North Bethesda, Maryland
  — cancelled due to COVID-19 pandemic.
 2021: September 18–19 — entire convention held online due to COVID-19 pandemic
 2022: September 17–18 — Bethesda North Marriott Hotel & Conference Center, North Bethesda, Maryland

SPX Anthology 
From 1997 to 2004, SPX published an annual anthology as a companion to the convention. The first edition (1997) was in standard comic format, while all subsequent editions were in digest format. Contributors included Alex Robinson, Frank Cho, Marc Hempel, Brian Ralph, and many others. The anthology was discontinued as an annual production after 2004.

References

External links
 

Comics conventions in the United States
Minicomics
501(c)(3) organizations
Recurring events established in 1994
Conventions in Maryland
1994 establishments in Maryland